Duped is a 1925 American silent Western film directed by J.P. McGowan and starring William Desmond,Helen Holmes and Dorothea Wolbert. It was released in Britain the following year under the alternative title of Steel and Gold.

Synopsis
A Wall Street investor heads west to California when he discovers that a gold mine he has backed is in danger of being lost due to the corruption of his foreman. Once there he falls in love with Dolores Verdiego and with her assistance he recovers control over his mine.

Cast
 William Desmond as John Morgan
 Helen Holmes as Dolores Verdiego 
 J.P. McGowan as 'Hard Rock' Ralston
 Dorothea Wolbert as Sweet Marie
 George Magrill as George Forsyth 
 Ford West as Marshal
 James Thompson as A-1

References

Bibliography
 Connelly, Robert B. The Silents: Silent Feature Films, 1910-36, Volume 40, Issue 2. December Press, 1998.
 Munden, Kenneth White. The American Film Institute Catalog of Motion Pictures Produced in the United States, Part 1. University of California Press, 1997.

External links
 

1925 films
1925 Western (genre) films
American silent feature films
Silent American Western (genre) films
American black-and-white films
Films directed by J. P. McGowan
1920s English-language films
1920s American films